Major General Sir Edward Michael Pakenham,  (19 March 1778 – 8 January 1815), was a British Army officer and politician. He was the son of the Baron Longford and the brother-in-law of the Duke of Wellington, with whom he served in the Peninsular War. During the War of 1812, he was commander of British forces in North America (1814–15). On 8 January 1815, Pakenham was killed in action while leading his men at the Battle of New Orleans.

Early life
Pakenham was born at Pakenham Hall (present-day Tullynally Castle) in County Westmeath, Ireland, to Edward Pakenham, 2nd Baron Longford, and his wife Catherine Rowley. He was educated at The Royal School, Armagh. His family purchased his commission as a lieutenant in the 92nd Regiment of Foot when he was only sixteen.

Political career
Between 1799 and 1800, Pakenham also represented Longford Borough in the Irish House of Commons.

Military career
Pakenham served with the 23rd Light Dragoons against the French in Ireland during the 1798 Rebellion and later in Nova Scotia, Barbados, and Saint Croix. He led his men in an attack on Saint Lucia in 1803, where he was wounded. He also fought in the Danish campaign at the Battle of Copenhagen (1807) and in Martinique against the French Empire, where he received another wounding. In 1806, his sister Catherine married Arthur Wellesley, the future Duke of Wellington.

Peninsular War

Pakenham, as adjutant-general, joined his well known in-law, the Duke of Wellington, in the Peninsular War. He commanded a regiment in the Battle of Bussaco in 1810 and in 1811 fought in the Battle of Fuentes de Onoro to defend the besieged fortress of Almeida, helping to secure a British victory. In 1812 he was praised for his performance at Salamanca in which he commanded the Third Division and hammered onto the flank of the extended French line. He also received the Army Gold Cross and clasps for the battles of Martinique, Busaco, Fuentes de Oñoro, Salamanca, Pyrenees, Nivelle, Nive, Orthez, and Toulouse.

War of 1812

In September 1814, Pakenham, having been promoted to the rank of major general, accepted an offer to replace General Robert Ross as commander of the British North American army, after Ross was killed during the skirmishing prior to the Battle of North Point near Baltimore.

The next year during the Battle of New Orleans while rallying his troops near the enemy line, grapeshot from US artillery shattered his left knee and killed his horse. As he was helped to his feet by his senior aide-de-camp, Major Duncan MacDougall, Pakenham was wounded a second time in his right arm. After he mounted MacDougall's horse, more grapeshot ripped through his spine, fatally wounding him, and he was carried off the battlefield on a stretcher. He was laid beneath the oaks which today still bear his name. He was 36. His last words were reputed to be telling MacDougall to find General John Lambert to tell him to assume command as well as "Tell him... tell Lambert to send forward the reserves."

The battle ended in defeat for the British. The American commander was Brevet Major General Andrew Jackson, who would go on to become the seventh President of the United States from 1829 to 1837. In a letter to James Monroe, Jackson described the shot that killed Pakenham:

A general ceasefire had already been declared by the Treaty of Ghent, signed on 24 December 1814, but as peace was not yet ratified in Washington as required by the treaty, the two nations were still formally at war. The news of the treaty did not reach the combatants until February, several weeks after the battle.

Wellington had held Pakenham in high regard and was deeply saddened by news of his death, commenting: We have but one consolation, that he fell as he lived, in the honourable discharge of his duty and distinguished as a soldier and a man. I cannot but regret that he was ever employed on such a service or with such a colleague. The expedition to New Orleans originated with that colleague... The Americans were prepared with an army in a fortified position which still would have been carried, if the duties of others, that is of the Admiral (Sir Alexander Cochrane), had been as well performed as that of he whom we now lament.

Legacy
There is a statue in his memory at the south transept of St Paul's Cathedral in London. His body was returned in a cask of rum and buried in the Pakenham family vault in Killucan in County Westmeath, Ireland.

The village of Pakenham in Ontario, Canada, named in honour of his role in the War of 1812. The village is located on the Mississippi River which originates from Mississippi Lake and empties into the Ottawa River.

There is also a suburb of Melbourne, Australia, named after him.

In the alternative "British Version" of Johnny Horton's novelty hit "The Battle of New Orleans," Horton refers to the British being led into battle by Pakenham. As with other 'historic' details of the song, Horton haphazardly styles him as "Colonel Pakeningham" despite his actually being General Pakenham.

Two streets in Chalmette, Louisiana, the site of the Battle of New Orleans, are named for Pakenham, Packenham Avenue and Packenham Drive.

See also
 List of Knights Companion of the Order of the Bath
 List of Knights Grand Cross of the Order of the Bath

References

Further reading
 The Plains of Chalmette - a Story of Crescent City (2015) by Jack Caldwell, an historical novel of the Battle of New Orleans
 Battle Kiss (2011) by O'Neil De Noux, epic war novel set around the Battle of New Orleans
 "Edward Michael Pakenham," A Dictionary of Louisiana Biography, Vol. 2 (1988), p. 627
 The Dawn's Early Light (1971), by Walter Lord

External links

 
 
 

1778 births
1815 deaths
18th-century Anglo-Irish people
19th-century Anglo-Irish people
British Army commanders of the Napoleonic Wars
British Army generals
British Army personnel of the War of 1812
British military personnel killed in the War of 1812
Burials in County Westmeath
Irish MPs 1798–1800
Knights Companion of the Order of the Bath
Knights Grand Cross of the Order of the Bath
Members of the Parliament of Ireland (pre-1801) for County Longford constituencies
Edward
People educated at The Royal School, Armagh
People from County Westmeath
People of the Irish Rebellion of 1798
Politicians from County Westmeath
Recipients of the Army Gold Cross
Younger sons of barons
British people of the War of 1812
British military personnel of the War of 1812